eBaseball Powerful Pro Baseball, previously known as Jikkyō Powerful Pro Yakyū and marketed internationally as Power Pros, is a Japanese baseball video game series created by Konami. The game is known for its super deformed characters, and fast-paced, but deep game play. Most games in the series are developed under license from the Nippon Professional Baseball (NPB) and the Japan Professional Baseball Players Association (JPBPA), letting them use the league's team names, stadiums, colors, and players' names and likenesses. There are also six games in the series with the Major League Baseball (MLB) and Major League Baseball Players Association (MLBPA) license, two with the Korea Baseball Organization (KBO) and Korea Professional Baseball Players Association (KPBPA), and one with the World Baseball Classic license. It is long running in Japan, starting out in 1994 for the Super Famicom, and appearing on many different consoles: Saturn (1995–1997), PlayStation (1994–2003), Nintendo 64 (1997–2001), PlayStation 2 (2000–2009), Dreamcast (2000), GameCube (2002–2006), Wii (2007–2009), PlayStation 3 (2010–2016), PlayStation 4 (since 2016) as well as PlayStation Portable (2007–2013) and Vita (2012-2018).

The game has two spin-off series: Professional Baseball Spirits, a baseball sports simulation series with more realistic graphics and physics, and Power Pro Kun Pocket. The latter was released on handheld systems between 1999 and 2014 with versions for the Game Boy Color, Game Boy Advance, and Nintendo DS. Although the series was originally designed as the side-story of Success mode and was part of the main series, Konami retroactively declared it as a separate series.

On May 12, 2006, a version of Power Pro was released featuring Major League Baseball players, under the title Jikkyō Powerful Major League. The Power Pro series has featured online play since its tenth incarnation on the PS2 and its first handheld version on the PlayStation Portable. A version of Power Pro was announced for the PlayStation 3, first shown at the Tokyo Game Show in 2005, but it would take another five years for the series to reach the PS3, with the system instead getting Power Pro's sister series, Professional Baseball Spirits, for the interim. On August 3, 2007, an American release of the series was announced for both the PlayStation 2 and the Wii. The game, titled MLB Power Pros, was published by 2K Sports, and features a Success Mode set within Major League Baseball.

The most distinctive feature of the Power Pro series is its odd depiction of characters. The basic design of the Power Pro baseball player is a short figure with an excessively wide, gashapon capsule-shaped head, lacking a mouth, nose, ears with expression being mainly in the eyebrows. Power Pros characters are somewhat similar to the character Rayman, in that they do not have legs and thus their feet are not connected to their body. Power Pros characters do have arms and hands; however, their hands are finger less and bear more resemblance to a sphere than a human hand. The Power Pro series has used this comic design for every single one of its games.

In Japan, the series has been critically acclaimed and commercially successful, while in North America it received mixed to generally favorable reviews and sold poorly. , the series has sold over 23.5 million copies, in addition to  mobile game downloads .

Games in the series
This is the major system development in the main series (as well as information of seasons series and MLB Power Pros series), some minor development, such as player's ability, are not included in the development.

Pawapuro '94
Released on February 24, 1994 for the Super Famicom. The game has the license of the Nippon Professional Baseball and the Japanese Professional Baseball Players Association, though the Meiji Jingu Stadium and the Hanshin Koshien Stadium are listed under a fictional name. Success mode is not included in the first two installments. Commentary is provided by Asahi Broadcasting Corporation radio commentator Abe Noriyuki.

Pawapuro 2
Released on February 24, 1995 for the Super Famicom. The first game in the series with full Pennant mode, and save game features. The Hanshin Koshien Stadium is fully licensed, but the Meiji Jingu Stadium is still listed under a fictional name. Commentary is provided by Asahi Broadcasting Corporation radio commentator Motoharu Ōta.

Pawapuro 3
Released on February 29, 1996 for the Super Famicom. Success mode, which becomes one of the main features in the Power Pros series, is firstly installed in this game. Commentary is once again provided by Abe Noriyuki, who stayed in this position until Power Pros 8.

Pawapuro 4
Released on March 14, 1997 for the Nintendo 64. With the generation leap, the game's graphics (polygon-based stadia), and controls greatly improved. The Success Mode firstly features original characters, some of them become regular even nowadays.

Pawapuro 5
Released on March 26, 1998 for the Nintendo 64. In March 1998, the game was the best-selling game for the Nintendo 64 in Japan.

Pawapuro 6
Also known as Jikkyō Powerful Pro Yakyū 6. Released on March 25, 1999 for the Nintendo 64.

Pawapuro 7
This game was the first in the series to be released on the PlayStation 2. First game in the series with fully polygon-based graphics. IGN thought that the game was fun, but criticized the games for its "horrible" graphics and for its lack of power on the new console. The game was due to be released on March 4, 2000, but was later pushed back to July 6, 2000.

Pawapuro 8
Vocalized opening ("Little Soldier" by Chihiro Yonekura) is firstly featured in the series, with the openings made by Kyoto Animation which mainly works on animation after-production at that time. They have been working on the openings until Pawapuro 11 as they had started working on the anime version of Air, a famous production from Visual Arts/Key. The production works are passed to Production I.G in Pawapuro 12.

Pawapuro 9
This game was the first in the series to be released on multiple platforms – PlayStation 2 and GameCube. This game was also the first in the series to employ cel shading.

Pawapuro 10
Success Mode first features creating teams instead of individual players. Online mode is firstly available in a main series title. And the only installment that allow machine crossovers. Mylife mode, an alternate type of Success Mode that player controls the Japan League player instead of original character (but you can still play created player in Success Mode), is firstly placed in this installment.

Pawapuro 11
Created for the 10th anniversary of the Power Pros series. Audio endings are first featured in Success Mode (made by Kyoto Animation), as well as the ability to break the bat and performing safety bunts.

Pawapuro 12
Modified player password system, means password systems cannot be placed on previous installment (for Nintendo side). However, password from 12–14, can be used on Portable 1 and Portable 2 (within Sony platform only). Cheering Songs Editor is available since this installment, like players, password system are used to transfer and import the songs. Cheering Songs can be transferred to any installment within the Sony's platform without restrictions. As long as that installment support Cheering Songs.

Jikkyō Powerful Major League
The game firstly features MLB instead of NPB series. It also holds the license for the 2009 World Baseball Classic.

Pawapuro 13
As Nintendo's GameCube has stopped production at that time, it is the only installment of main series that only features in PS2 platform since 8. Major system changes have been placed in this installment. In online mode, every players only control one player in the team, not a whole team. Scenario Mode, a feature since the first series is cancelled from this installment.

Pawapuro 14/Wii
Wii platform is added in Nintendo side, replacing GC for the future installment in Pawapuro (and MLB PP series), as a feature of Wii, motion control system is supported in Wii side, both versions support online mode which adepts system in 13 (but controlling three players instead), in separated server. Success Mode firstly features leading a high-school team, targeted at Summer Koshien Champion. Later also feature currently Japanese NPB players as members of the National Team.

Jikkyō Powerful Major League 2 (MLB Power Pros)
The series finally officially has its debut in America, numbers of Japanese players who had turned into a Major League Player participated.

Pawapuro 2009/NEXT
Released for the 15th anniversary of the series. Also, numbered versions are established for the first time since '94. And different unique contents (apart than control and console feature differences) are firstly featured in different versions.

Power Pros 2010 
Released on July 15, 2010 for the PlayStation 3 and PlayStation Portable. 2010 is the first game in the series which supports high-definition video (1080p), true surround sound (5.1 channel LPCM). Mylife mode is omitted from the PlayStation 3 release.

Power Pros 2011 
Released on July 14, 2011 for the PlayStation 3 and PlayStation Portable. Unlike the previous installment, the two version have the same content.

Power Pros 2012 
Released on July 19, 2012 for the PlayStation 3, PlayStation Portable and PlayStation Vita. The game introduced significant gameplay mechanic changes to the series, including the PawaSta mode, which is only available in the PlayStation 3 and Vita versions.

Power Pros 2013 
Released on October 24, 2013 for the PlayStation 3, PlayStation Portable and PlayStation Vita. Unlike 2012, the game is also compatible with the PlayStation TV microconsole.

Power Pros 2014 
Released on October 23, 2014 for the PlayStation 3 and PlayStation Vita to commemorate the series twentieth anniversary. 2014 is the first game in the main series, which have active Japanese MLB players as "OB players".

Power Pros 2016 
Released on April 28, 2016 for the PlayStation 3, PlayStation 4 and PlayStation Vita to commemorate the Success mode's twentieth anniversary. The game introduced many game play elements to the series, lifted from the Professional Baseball Spirits series. On April 27, 2017 the game was updated with 2017 season rosters, the players are able to choose from the 2016 and 2017 rosters upon launching the game. The game also introduced two new game modes to the series, "PawaFes" and "Challenge".

Power Pros 2018 
Released on April 28, 2018 for the PlayStation 4 and PlayStation Vita. 2018 is the first game in the series to support the PlayStation VR and PlayStation 4 Pro, along with high-dynamic-range video and 2160p resolution. The game also includes a new game mode, "Live Scenario", lifted from Professional Baseball Spirits 2015. A 2019 season pack was recently added as an updated feature to Power Pros 2018.

Power Pros (Nintendo Switch) 
Released on June 27, 2019 for the Nintendo Switch. The Success mode is a remake version of some scenarios in Power Pros 9.

eBaseball Powerful Pro Baseball 2020 
Released on July 9, 2020 for the PlayStation 4 and Nintendo Switch. It is the first entry in the series to feature Konami's eBASEBALL branding in its official title.

eBaseball Powerful Pro Baseball 2022 
Revealed on January 13, 2022, this game was released for PlayStation 4 and Nintendo Switch on April 21, 2022.One of The success modes, Rivals, features selected events from Power Pros 9, Power Pros 13 and Power Pros 2011.

WBSC eBaseball: Power Pros (2023) 
Announced on July 20, 2022, which will collaborate between Konami and World Baseball Softball Confederation. The game will also become the first Powerful Pro Baseball game featuring English since MLB Power Pros.

In October 24, 2022, Konami had filed a trademark for “eBASEBALL Power Pros”, this trademark was confirmed by Japanese authorities and made public on November 1st, 2022.

The game was announced in a Nintendo Direct presentation on February 8, 2023, and launched on the same day for Nintendo Switch and PS4/PS5 gaming consoles.

The Success Mode
The Success Mode is the game's most notable feature , combining role-playing game and life simulation games elements with the baseball sport. The basic objective is to train a generic Pawapurokun to become a professional baseball player. The Pawapurokun starts out with low stats, but often ends up exceeding the real professional players included in the game. Generally, Pawapurokun begins as an amateur player (ranging from high school, college or company player) who must become a professional in a certain period (usually three years). The Success Mode takes only about 2 hours to complete, but creating a good player requires an extraordinary amount of skill and luck, giving the game almost infinite replay value.  Various random events will affect the growth of your player, for example, getting a girlfriend will allow you to regain motivation easily and receive presents (which drastically improve your player's stats) on your birthday. The amount of stress caused, and number of Pawapurokuns killed off in the Success Mode can be very large,  as someone can spend hours carefully training a Pawapurokun, only to see him become severely injured in a car accident, ending any chance of his becoming a good player. "All A's" Pawapurokuns (characters that have all of their stats in the highest range) are particularly sought after, since you can transfer Pawapurokuns from one memory card to the other using a password, and use them in exhibition games (It is noted that password have different formats between Sony and Nintendo side, which means you cannot transfer a password from PS2/PSP to a GC/Wii/NDS/GBA Pawapuro installments, and vice versa).  Often a cheat device such as Action Replay is used to generate incredibly strong Pawapurokuns, and several fansites (such as mlbppworld.com) offer to create customized Pawapurokuns in exchange for voting for the site in a web ranking.  As Success mode is the most popular major part of the Pawapuro Series, thus there are no ability editing mode in Pawapuro series (except American installment's MLB Power Pros) which become a regular element in other sport games. The plot as well as the storyline of the Success Mode has a profound effect on the game's popularity, as many users would rather replay older Pawapuro games that have good Success Modes than buy a newer installment that has new data and improved gameplay, but a bad Success Mode.

In Pawapuro 14, players can become a coach instead of Pawapurokun, leading a high school team to Koshien Champion, it is somewhat an alternate way to create a large amount of Pawapurokuns in the same time. The mode does not require any skill in pitching, catching nor batting on their own, but require planning and tactics skill like other sport-manager game. Later, 14 Kettei-ban firstly features enhancing current NPB players, and placing them as original players.

The main background of Pawapurokun in various installments are below:
3:  Reserve player (in NPB team)
4:  Reserve player (in NPB team)
5:  High School Student
6:  University player
7:  Reserve player (in NPB team)
8:  Fantasy Story (High School/University/Company player can be chosen)
9:  High School Student
10: An NPB fictional team Reserve
11: University Team/Japan National Team (as amateur player)
12: Student in baseball academy/Company amateur player/Dropout in baseball academy
Major League: Player in independent league
13: High School Student (World High School Championship is added in Kettei-ban)
14: Reserve of Vulcans, An NPB fictional league team.
MLBPP: University Student
15: Company amateur player
MLBPP08: An AA/AAA player

For Managers:
10: Playing-owner of the professional- Success All Stars (Kettei-ban only)
14: High School Team, Japan National Team (Kettei-ban only)
15: High School Team

Through the background of the story and events of the series usually have connection with the sequel and the pre-sequel (which also gives conflicts, which sometimes major character returns to university or company), but may not be in the same chronological order. For example, 7 is actually the sequel of the events in 9, and 10 is the sequel of 13. but, 11 and 12 are actually parallel stories that branch off from 13 and have no connection with 10. The only exception is Yabe Akio, the original outfielder who appeared in every installment of main series (since 4) who will always be the Pawapuro-kun's first partner no matter what (in which he appeared wearing Nippon-Ham Fighters (now the Hokkaido Nippon Ham Fighters) uniform in the openings in 7, 8 and 9). Currently Konami should have set the main storyline in the sequence of 9 (P3) -> 7 -> 13 -> 10 -> 14.

In the early series before 10, major characters are spread into different real NPB teams, after the installment 10, four original teams (Powerfuls, Keysers, Cathands, and Yanks) were formed in Pacific League and Central League to room original characters, in which some minor characters would stay in the real teams and being opponents. Two more teams, Vulcans and Busters were added in 14 and formed the fictional third league "Revolutional League" with the prior 4 original teams, according to storyline of 14, the league participated in Japan Series in its fourth year since establishment. Other than team formations, the major regulations of NPB are kept (including the playoff system introduced in 2007 season), only having a shorter Pennant span, in order to keep the gametime under three hours. (Except Pawapuro 9, 10 and 99' which there are more complete matches, or particular mode in 11, 13, 14). Usually players are not needed (and not permitted to) play all innings unless player involves it, being a captain in final stages of the success mode, or the success mode itself does not give status point in practices.

Due to the possibility of copyright conflict towards MLB (particularly before the release of the MLB series after Pawapuro 12), the American League system in NPB series is called the UBL (Possibly named as USA Baseball League) in NPB series, which are composed by three grades: Single Star, Double Stars, and the top-ranked Regular League, similar to the AA, AAA, and MLB system in the real world. Such naming were continued to use in 13 and 14 even the MLB series released, and it is believed to continue to use to make story connections to the other NPB installments since some players are set in the UBL. Currently MLB series' success modes did not feature as a position of MLB player yet (but AAA players in MLB Power Pros 2008).

For another remarks, there are numbers of female players appeared in the series with some of them have remarkable performances. At least four female players in main series have gone through Koshien and turned Pro (through one is never seen as being released later).

Since the 7th installment, usually the opening sequences gives some clues of the story line of the success mode, especially for the 9th and 10th installments while professional players are only given a very brief cameos, Success Mode characters filled the major parts in the openings.

Sub-series usually featured independent scenarios (or even not featuring success mode), the most renowned one was in the 99' installment, which there has a mode called "Mekkou-Tou", which consecutive battles with all the original teams appeared in the past success mode (whenever appears in main-series, Power Pro Kun Pocket series, or even appeared in the later series), it is still one of the legendary modes that the later series didn't revive.

The Power Pro Kun Pocket series, rather than focusing on real-life baseball worlds, many fantasy elements were added in the series. Since the second installment, two success modes were placed in each installments, while the normal success mode usually featured high-school or professional baseball (unlike main series, fantasy elements are usually mixed in the series), the second success, called "Inner Success" mode, usually placed the Power Pro Kun in the various worlds, varying from the Medieval Ages, ancient times, and to future worlds. Fantasy elements are very uncommon in the main series, but Konami did it in 8, which the (optional) final battle is versus aneroid players which legendary players' data were inserted.

Mylife mode
Due to the great success of success mode, Konami have someway extended to another game mode called Mylife since Pawapuro 10, which can use created player (or using an NPB player, even creating a player at place) to play in the NPB, with another series of events, through there are no more characters from success mode appears in it. The difficulty will change according to your performance in the game.

The known mode in Mylife mode are:
Loan player: Playing as a loan player from other team, maximum playtime is one year.
Playing Manager: Playing as a playing manager, maximum playtime is one year. Whenever the team lose the possibility claiming the League Champion (or playoff in Pacific League). Currently available in 13.
Pro players: Choosing one current NPB players, maximum playtime is 20 years.
Note: If you choose Yakult Swallows' catcher Atsuya Furuta as your player in the Mylife mode in 13 or 14, playing manager duties are added. However, maximum playtime is reduced to two years. (Atsuya was a playing manager in 2006 and 2007 season, he retired in 2007)
Retiring player: Playing the retiring year of your career, available in 14.
Original players: Using players created in success mode to play in Mylife.

MLB version did not feature Mylife mode until the 2008 installment, in which it is known as MLB Life mode.

The Gyroball within Power Pros
The Power Pros series raised some controversy in Japan with its use of the term "Gyroball", a term made popular by Japanese pitcher Daisuke Matsuzaka when he signed with the Boston Red Sox. The Gyroball appears not as a pitch usable in a baseball game, but as one of the special abilities assigned to particular pitchers. In Pawapuro, pitchers that have the Gyroball ability get increased velocity on their fastball, which is completely different from the actual definition of a Gyroball (a pitch with a spin resembling that of a slider). Power Pro and other baseball manga (which also give misinterpretations of the Gyroball) have given the impression that the Gyroball is an all-powerful strike out pitch, which it is not. Several professional pitchers (including classic players) are given this ability in the game, but Daisuke Matsuzaka is not given the Gyroball ability in any of the game's installments.
Daisuke does not appear in Pawapuro 14 as he was transferred via Posting system to Boston Red Sox, through two-seam ball which made closer to his pitching is added in this installment. It is expected Daisuke will return as a Seibu OB somedays (through Daisuke's official password has been released in MLB Power Pros 2), but his ability changes is still unknown at this moment.

Games in the series
Below is a rough list of the games within the Power Pro series. Basically, can de divided into certain categories below.

Main Series: Ending with only number suffixes (except '94, the first series), most major system amendments (including success mode) are placed in the main series. Number series are not used after 15.

Season Series: A PlayStation exclusive series, ending with suffix in year number, it is mainly an alternate installment of the main series which is installed in Super Famicom and PlayStation 2. This series has been merged to the main series as the PlayStation had stopped being manufactured. Since 1998, two installments are released every year, one normal version in the start of the season,  and one named Kettei-ban(Post-Season version), with the latter have statistic (and sometime involving player transfers) update that reflects his performance in the season. This has become one of the tradition of Konami even after this has been merged in the main series, much like the Winning Eleven series with a more frequently update. Ketten-ban version is cancelled in 15 (But they used on Pro Baseball Spirits instead). However, year series are revived after that.

MLB Power Pro Series: The only series that is officially released in America, it features MLB series instead of traditional Japanese NPB series, through Japanese version is also available. See the MLB Power Pros entry for further details.

It is noted that passwords cannot be used on same installments with different manufacturer's machine (Sony/Nintendo has their own password format). Passwords of Power Pros (Japanese version) cannot be used on American version either.

Main Series

Consumer Series
 Jikkyou Powerful Pro Baseball '95 (PS) – 1994 Dec 22
 Jikkyou Powerful Pro Baseball '95 version of the opening (PS, SS) – 1995 July 14 (PS), 1995 July 28 (SS)
 Jikkyou Powerful Pro Baseball '96 version of the opening (SFC) – 1996 July 19
 Jikkyou Powerful Pro Baseball '97 version of the opening (PS) – 1997 August 28
 Jikkyou Powerful Pro Baseball S (SS) – 1997 yDec. 4
 BASIC powerful professional baseball play-by-play version of'98 (SFC) – 1998 March 19
 PAWAPURO GB (GB) – 1998 March 26
 Jikkyou Powerful Pro Baseball '98 version of the opening (PS) – 1998 July 23
 Jikkyou Powerful Pro Baseball '98 Ketteihan (PS) – 1998 Dec 23
 Jikkyou Powerful Pro Baseball '99 version of the opening (PS) – 1999 July 22
 Jikkyou Powerful'99 Ketteihan baseball (PS) – 1999 Dec 25
 Jikkyou Powerful Pro Baseball DreamcastEdition (DC) – 2000 March 30
 Jikkyou Powerful Pro Baseball 2000 (N64) – 2000 April 29
 Jikkyou Powerful Pro Baseball 2000 version of the opening (PS) – 2000 July 19
 Ketteihan powerful 2000 play-by-play professional baseball (PS) – 2000 Dec 21
 Basic version Jikkyou Powerful Pro Baseball 2001 (N64) – 2001 March 29
 Jikkyou Powerful Pro Baseball 2001 (PS) – 2001 June 7
 Ketteiban powerful 2001 play-by-play professional baseball (PS) – 2001 Dec 20
 Jikkyou Powerful Pro Baseball 2002 Spring (PS) – 2002 March 14
 Jikkyou Powerful Pro Baseball Premium Edition (PS) – 2003 January 23
 Jikkyou Powerful Pro Baseball Portable (PSP) – 2006 April 1
 Jikkyou Powerful Pro Major League (PS2, GC) – 2006 May 11
 Jikkyou Powerful Pro Baseball Portable 2 (PSP) – 2007 April 5
 Jikkyou Powerful Pro Baseball Wii (Wii) – 2007 July 19
 Ketteiban Jikkyou Powerful Pro Baseball Wii (Wii) – 2007 Dec 20
 Jikkyou Powerful Pro Major League 2 (a.k.a. MLB Power Pros) (PS2, Wii)- 2007 Oct 4 (Overseas Edition: October 3, 2007)
 Jikkyou Powerful Pro Baseball Portable 3 (PSP) – 2008 May 29
 Jikkyou Powerful Pro Major League 3 (a.k.a. MLB Power Pros 2008) (PS2, Wii, DS) – 2008 Oct 3 (Overseas Edition: July 29, 2008)
 Jikkyou Powerful Pro Baseball NEXT (Wii) – 2009 March 19
 Jikkyou Powerful Pro Baseball 2009 (PS2, Wii) – 2009 April 29
 Jikkyou Powerful Pro Baseball Portable 4 (PSP) – 2009 September 17
 Pawapuro Success Legends (PSP) – 2010 February 25
 Jikkyou Powerful Pro Baseball 2010 (PS3, PSP) – 2010 July 15

Arcade Series
 Jikkyou Powerful Pro Baseball '96 (Arcade) – 1996
 Jikkyou Powerful Pro Baseball EX – 1997 year ※ PAWAPURO arcade version of the movie. Consumer Edition ahead of the home run race mode is added.
 Jikkyou Powerful Pro Baseball '98 EX – 1998 year
 Jikkyou Powerful Pro Baseball Ball Spark (Arcade) – 2015

PC Series
 Jikkyou Powerful Pro Baseball '96 (Windows version) (Win) – 1997 February 21
 Jikkyou Powerful Pro Baseball (Windows second edition) (Win) – 1998
 Powerful professional baseball play-by-play online version (Win) – 2001

Play Online Series
 Powerful Pro Baseball Online – (2004 April 30 delivered end)

Mobile Phones
 Powerful mobile professional baseball official licensed version of 2007 (NTT DoCoMo au by KDDI SoftBank) – 2007
 Powerful mobile professional baseball official licensed version of 2008 (NTT DoCoMo au by KDDI SoftBank) – 2008
 Power Pro World University Baseball Success Volume – 2009
 Power Pro World High School Baseball Success Volume – 2009
 Power Pro World Shakaijin Yakyū Success Volume – 2009
 Power Pro World Mobile – Powerful Pro Baseball MEGA-X – 2009
 Power Pro World Mobile Powerful Pro Baseball 6 – 2009
 Power Pro World Fierce Fighting High School Baseball Success Volume – 2010
 Mobile Powerful Pro Baseball 3D – 2010
 Social Appli Power Pro home run competition for GREE – 2011
  – 2013
 Jikkyō Powerful Pro Yakyū (iOS/Android) – 2014
 Pawapuro Puzzle – 2021

Card Game
 Powerful Pro Yakyū Card Game – 2006
 Powerful Major League Card Game – 2006

Other Appearances
Konami Krazy Racers (GBA, 2001)- a Pawapurokun appears as a racer.
DreamMix TV World Fighters (GC, 2003) – a Pawapurokun appears as a playable character, along with a Pawapuro Stadium stage.
New International Track and Field (DS, 2008) – a Pawapurokun appears as a playable character
Krazy Kart Racing (iOS, 2009) – a Pawapurokun appears as a racer.

Related Productions
Shōnen Sunday x Shōnen Magazine: Nettou! Dream Nine (DS, 2009)- The baseball game developed by Pawapuro Production, featuring characters from Weekly Shōnen Sunday and Weekly Shōnen Magazine's manga (like Major, A of Daiya, Touch, Kyojin's Hoshi, Fairy Tail, Kekkaishi, Samurai Deeper Kyo, Project ARMS, and more).

Reception

Critical reception 
The series generally receives favorable reviews from Japanese video game magazines. Twelve installment received the "silver prize" (30–31/40) from Famitsu, while twenty seven received the "gold prize" (32–34/40), and twenty installment received the "platinum prize". Only seven game in the series got a score below 30/40.

{| class="wikitable" style="font-size: 90%; float: right; margin:0.5em 0 0.5em 1em;"
|-
|+Critical reception
! Year
! Title
! Famitsu score
|-
!colspan="3"|Main games
|-
| 1994
| Jikkyō Powerful Pro Yakyū '94
| 34/40 (SFC)
|-
| 1995
| Jikkyō Powerful Pro Yakyū 2
| 31/40 (SFC)
|-
| 1996
| Jikkyō Powerful Pro Yakyū 3
| 30/40 (SFC)
|-
| 1997
| Jikkyō Powerful Pro Yakyū 4
| 33/40 (N64)
|-
| 1998
| Jikkyō Powerful Pro Yakyū 5
| 33/40 (N64)
|-
| 1999
| Jikkyō Powerful Pro Yakyū 6
| 36/40 (N64)
|-
| 2000
| Jikkyō Powerful Pro Yakyū 7
| 35/40 (PS2)
|-
| 2001
| Jikkyō Powerful Pro Yakyū 8
| 33/40 (PS2)
|-
| 2002
| Jikkyō Powerful Pro Yakyū 9
| 34/40 (GCN/PS2)
|-
| 2003
| Jikkyō Powerful Pro Yakyū 10
| 36/40 (GCN/PS2)
|-
| 2004
| Jikkyō Powerful Pro Yakyū 11
| 35/40 (GCN/PS2)
|-
| 2005
| Jikkyō Powerful Pro Yakyū 12
| 35/40(PS2)33/40 (GCN)
|-
| 2006
| Jikkyō Powerful Pro Yakyū 13
| 33/40 (PS2)
|-
| 2007
| Jikkyō Powerful Pro Yakyū 14/Wii
| 34/40 (Wii)
|-
| 2008
| Jikkyō Powerful Pro Yakyū 15
| 35/40 (PS2/Wii)
|-
| 2009
| Jikkyō Powerful Pro Yakyū 2009
| 28/40 (PS2)
|-
| 2010
| Jikkyō Powerful Pro Yakyū 2010'''実況パワフルプロ野球2010 (PSP)の関連情報 | ゲーム・エンタメ最新情報のファミ通.com
| 38/40 (PS3)34/40 (PSP)
|-
| 2011
| Jikkyō Powerful Pro Yakyū 2011| 37/40 (PS3)36/40 (PSP)
|-
| 2012
| Jikkyō Powerful Pro Yakyū 2012| 36/40 (PS Vita)35/40 (PS3)33/40 (PSP)
|-
| 2013
| Jikkyō Powerful Pro Yakyū 2013| 35/40 (PS3)34/40 (PS Vita)31/40 (PSP)
|-
| 2014
| Jikkyō Powerful Pro Yakyū 2014| 35/40 (PS3/PS Vita)
|-
| 2016
| Jikkyō Powerful Pro Yakyū 2016| 37/40 (PS3/PS4/PS Vita)
|-
| 2018
| Jikkyō Powerful Pro Yakyū 2018| 38/40 (PS4/PS Vita)
|-
!colspan="3"|Roster updates
|-
| 2003
| Jikkyō Powerful Pro Yakyū 10 Chō Kettei-ban 2003 Memorial| 33/40 (GCN/PS2)
|-
| 2004
| Jikkyō Powerful Pro Yakyū 11 Chō Kettei-ban| 32/40 (GCN/PS2)
|-
| 2005
| Jikkyō Powerful Pro Yakyū 12 Kettei-ban| 33/40 (PS2)32/40 (GCN)
|-
| 2006
| Jikkyō Powerful Pro Yakyū 13 Kettei-ban| 35/40 (PS2)
|-
| 2007
| Jikkyō Powerful Pro Yakyū 14/Wii Kettei-ban実況パワフルプロ野球14決定版 (PS2)の関連情報 | ゲーム・エンタメ最新情報のファミ通.com
| 34/40 (Wii)33/40 (PS2)
|-
| 2012
| Jikkyō Powerful Pro Yakyū 2012 Kettei-ban| 35/40 (PS Vita)34/40 (PS3)33/40 (PSP)
|-
!colspan="3"|Side games
|-
| 1994
| Jikkyō Powerful Pro Yakyū '95| 31/40 (PS)
|-
| 1995
| Jikkyō Powerful Pro Yakyū '95 Kaimaku-ban| 31/40 (SS)
|-
| 1997
| Jikkyō Powerful Pro Yakyū '97 Kaimaku-ban| 29/40 (PS)
|-
| 1997
| Jikkyō Powerful Pro Yakyū S| 26/40 (SS)
|-
| 1998
| Pawapuro GB| 20/40 (GB)
|-
| 1998
| Jikkyō Powerful Pro Yakyū '98 Kaimaku-ban| 30/40 (PS)
|-
| 1999
| Jikkyō Powerful Pro Yakyū '99 Kaimaku-ban| 33/40 (PS)
|-
| 1999
| Jikkyō Powerful Pro Yakyū '99 Kettei-ban| 33/40 (PS)
|-
| 2000
| Jikkyō Powerful Pro Yakyū Dreamcast Edition| 31/40 (DC)
|-
| 2000
| Jikkyō Powerful Pro Yakyū 2000| 34/40 (PS)
|-
| 2000
| Jikkyō Powerful Pro Yakyū 2000 Kaimaku-ban| 29/40 (PS)
|-
| 2001
| Jikkyō Powerful Pro Yakyū 2001| 30/40 (PS)
|-
| 2002
| Jikkyō Powerful Pro Yakyū 2002 Haru| 31/40 (PS)
|-
| 2006
| Jikkyō Powerful Pro Yakyū Portable| 32/40 (PSP)
|-
| 2007
| Jikkyō Powerful Pro Yakyū Portable 2| 34/40 (PSP)
|-
| 2008
| Jikkyō Powerful Pro Yakyū Portable 3| 33/40 (PSP)
|-
| 2009
| Jikkyō Powerful Pro Yakyū Next| 34/40 (Wii)
|-
| 2009
| Jikkyō Powerful Pro Yakyū Portable 4| 35/40 (PSP)
|-
| 2010
| Power Pro Success Legends| 29/40 (PSP)
|-
| 2010
| Nettō! Powerful Kōshinen| 31/40 (NDS)
|-
| 2016
| Jikkyō Powerful Pro Yakyū Heroes| 30/40 (3DS)
|-
!colspan="3"|Major League subseries
|-
| 2006
| Jikkyō Powerful Major League| 34/40 (GCN)
|-
| 2007
| Jikkyō Powerful Major League 2実況パワフルメジャーリーグ2Wii (Wii)の関連情報 | ゲーム・エンタメ最新情報のファミ通.com
| 30/40 (PS2/Wii)
|-
| 2008
| Jikkyō Powerful Major League 3実況パワフルメジャーリーグ3 (Wii)の関連情報 | ゲーム・エンタメ最新情報のファミ通.com
| 31/40 (PS2/Wii)
|-
| 2009
| Jikkyō Powerful Major League 2009実況パワフルメジャーリーグ2009 (Wii)の関連情報 | ゲーム・エンタメ最新情報のファミ通.com
| 35/40 (PS2/Wii)
|}

 Commercial reception 
, the series has sold over 23.5 million copies, in addition to 44 million mobile game downloads as of October 2020. Power Pros is the best-selling baseball video game franchise in Japan since 1997. 97 Kaimaku-ban, 98 Kaimaku-ban, 99 Kaimaku-ban, 10, 12, 2013, 2016, and 2018 earned the gold prize at PlayStation Awards, for shipping more than 500,000 units, including downloads, in Asia.

The mobile game Jikkyō Powerful Pro Yakyū'' has received  downloads.

Notes

References

External links 
 

Nippon Professional Baseball video games
Baseball video games
CloverWorks
Konami franchises
Konami games
Kyoto Animation
Production I.G
Video game franchises
Wii Wi-Fi games
Nintendo Wi-Fi Connection games
Wii games
Video game franchises introduced in 1994
Konami arcade games
Video games developed in Japan